Haycock Township is a township in Bucks County, Pennsylvania, United States. The population was 2,225 at the 2010 census.

Geography
It is drained by the Tohickon Creek eastward into the Delaware River. Lake Nockamixon forms much of its southeastern border.

Its villages include Applebachsville, Danneltown, Doanston, Haycock, Pullen (also in Richland and Springfield Townships), Reiffs Corner, Shoupville, Sterners Mill, Strawntown, Thatcher, and Tohickon. 

Natural features found in the township include Dimple Creek, Haycock Creek, Haycock Mountain, Kimble Creek, and Tohickon Creek.

Neighboring municipalities
 Springfield Township (north)
 Nockamixon Township (east)
 Bedminster Township (southeast)
 East Rockhill Township (southwest)
 Richland Township (west)

Demographics

As of the 2010 census, the borough was 96.3% White, 1.0% Black or African American, 0.1% Native American, 0.5% Asian, and 1.0% were two or more races. 1.0% of the population were of Hispanic or Latino ancestry.

As of the census of 2000, there were 2,191 people, 805 households, and 618 families residing in the township. The population density was 10.92 people per square mile (4.2/km2). There were 841 housing units at an average density of .419/sq mi (0.162/km2). The racial makeup of the township was 97.99% White, 0.37% African American, 0.09% Native American, 0.91% Asian, 0.23% Pacific Islander, 0.09% from other races, and 0.32% from two or more races. Hispanic or Latino of any race were 0.27% of the population.

There were 805 households, out of which 32.9% had children under the age of 18 living with them, 68.4% were married couples living together, 5.5% had a female householder with no husband present, and 23.2% were non-families. 16.1% of all households were made up of individuals, and 6.2% had someone living alone who was 65 years of age or older. The average household size was 2.71 and the average family size was 3.08.

In the township the population was spread out, with 23.1% under the age of 18, 6.6% from 18 to 24, 29.6% from 25 to 44, 30.6% from 45 to 64, and 10.0% who were 65 years of age or older. The median age was 40 years. For every 100 females there were 106.5 males. For every 100 females age 18 and over, there were 104.6 males.

The median income for a household in the township was $61,061, and the median income for a family was $66,326. Males had a median income of $43,929 versus $27,500 for females. The per capita income for the township was $25,431. About 3.0% of families and 4.3% of the population were below the poverty line, including 10.6% of those under age 18 and none of those age 65 or over.

Emergency Services
Haycock Township is served by the Pennsylvania State Police, the Haycock Fire Co. No. 1, and Upper Bucks Regional EMS.

Transportation

Pennsylvania Route 563 is the only numbered highway directly serving Haycock Township. It follows Mountain View Drive on a southwest-to-northeast alignment through the southeastern section of the township.

Education

Quakertown Community School District serves public school students in Haycock Township. Most township students attend Neidig Elementary School in Quakertown for grades K-5. All attend the Sixth Grade Center for sixth grade, Strayer Middle School for grades 7-8, and Quakertown Community High School for grades 9-12.

Climate

According to the Köppen climate classification system, Haycock Twp has a Hot-summer, Humid continental climate (Dfa). Dfa climates are characterized by at least one month having an average mean temperature ≤ , at least four months with an average mean temperature ≥ , at least one month with an average mean temperature ≥  and no significant precipitation difference between seasons. Although most summer days are slightly humid in Haycock Twp, episodes of heat and high humidity can occur with heat index values > . The average wettest month is July which corresponds with the annual peak in thunderstorm activity. Episodes of extreme cold and wind can occur with wind chill values < . Ice storms and large snowstorms depositing ≥  of snow occur once every few years, particularly during nor’easters from December through February.

Ecology

According to the A. W. Kuchler U.S. potential natural vegetation types, Haycock Twp would have a dominant vegetation type of Appalachian Oak (104) with a dominant vegetation form of Eastern Hardwood Forest (25). The spring bloom typically begins by April 15th and fall color usually peaks by October 26th.

References

External links

 Haycock Township
 Haycock Fire Company
 Pennsylvania State Police
 Upper Bucks Emergency Medical Services

Townships in Bucks County, Pennsylvania